Admiral Sirimevan Sarathchandra Ranasinghe, WWV, RWP, USP is a retired Sri Lankan admiral and the former Commander of the Sri Lanka Navy.

Early life and education
Ranasinghe received his education from St. Joseph's College, Anuradhapura and the Anuradhapura Central College. He holds an MPhil in Defence and Strategic Studies from the University of Madras and a Msc in War Studies and Defence Management from the National Defence University, Pakistan.

Naval career
He enlisted in the Sri Lanka Navy as an Officer Cadet in its 11th Intake on 15 November 1982, undergoing basic training at the Naval and Maritime Academy, Trincomalee, where he was adjudged the best cadet and selected for an international midshipmen course at the Britannia Royal Naval College, Dartmouth, which he attended between 1984 and 1985. He is an anti submarine warfare specialist (having trained at INS Venduruthy), and did his Naval Staff Course in 1999 at the Defence Services Staff College in Wellington, India. Ranasinghe has held the command of various ships and craft during his career in the navy, including SLNS Samudura (Commissioning Commanding Officer of US Coast Guard Cutter received from the United States of America), and the Fast Attack Squadron between 2002 and 2004. He attended the Allied Officers’ War Course at the National Defence University in Islamabad in 2007, and a National Defence Course in 2012 at the National Defence College, New Delhi.

President Maithripala Sirisena appointed Ranasinghe the Chief of Staff of the Sri Lanka Navy with effect from 11 July 2015. Prior to this appointment, he served as the 4th Director General of the Sri Lanka Coast Guard (appointed in August 2016). Other commands he has held include the Western Naval Command (2013-2014), Southern Naval Command (2012) and Deputy to the Southern Naval Command (2008). Staff commands he has held include those as Commandant of the Naval and Maritime Academy, Director Naval Operations, Director Naval Weapons, Director Marine Special Forces and Director Naval Projects and Plans.

Ranasinghe was appointed Commander of the Navy effective 26 October 2017, replacing Travis Sinniah. He was promoted to the rank of Admiral on 31 December 2018 and retired on 1 January 2019.

Personal life
Sirimevan is a keen sportsman, and has received Britannia Royal Naval College Colours for Badminton, and a Triple Crown in Badminton in the Inter-command Navy Tournament 1997.

References

Commanders of the Navy (Sri Lanka)
Graduates of Britannia Royal Naval College
Living people
National Defense University alumni
Sinhalese military personnel
Sri Lankan admirals
University of Madras alumni
Year of birth missing (living people)
National Defence College, India alumni
Defence Services Staff College alumni